Gabriele Rumi (4 September 1939 – 21 May 2001) was an Italian Formula One team owner. He was born in Palazzolo sull'Oglio.

Career

Early career
Rumi's grandfather Gabriele Rumi opened an iron foundry in Brescia. Rumi took over the running of the business in 1961. Within the decade, Rumi visited the Monte Bondone hillclimb event near Trento. In 1970 Rumi decided to diversify the business into the light alloy sector, to produce parts for engines and other uses for motor vehicles. In 1972 he started his own alloy wheel business, Fondmetal.

Formula One
Rumi began his involvement in Formula One motor racing when he sponsored fellow countryman Piercarlo Ghinzani. In 1990, Rumi bought the Osella team and renamed the team Fondmetal the following year. Fondmetal was shut down at the end of 1992 due to the high costs of running the team. However, the company remained in Formula One by leasing out their own wind tunnel to other competitors. In 1996, Rumi returned to the position of a team owner when he was a member of a consortium which brought Minardi and became the team's majority shareholder in 1997. At the end of 2000, Rumi sold his shares in Minardi to the Pan-American Sports Network who sponsored their driver Gastón Mazzacane who later sold the team to Australian businessman Paul Stoddart.

Death
Rumi died of cancer on 21 May 2001 aged 61.

References

1939 births
2001 deaths
People from the Province of Brescia
Deaths from cancer in Lombardy
Formula One team owners
Formula One team principals
Italian motorsport people